Munida affinis is a species of squat lobster in the family Munididae.

References

Squat lobsters
Crustaceans of the Atlantic Ocean
Crustaceans described in 1880
Taxa named by  Alphonse Milne-Edwards